The United French Polishers' Society was a trade union representing french polishers in the United Kingdom.

History
The union was founded in 1901, and appears to have largely consisted of members who split away from the Amalgamated Society of French Polishers of Great Britain and Ireland.  Initially, it had 1,478 members based in ten branches, all in London.  In 1903, 148 members split away to form the rival Old Alliance Society of French Polishers, but that union was not successful and rejoined in 1908.

The union affiliated to the Labour Party and the Trades Union Congress.  It was reluctant to merge into the National Amalgamated Furnishing Trades Association (NAFTA), the main union for the industry.  In 1969, it finally merged into NAFTA's successor, the National Union of Furniture Trade Operatives.

General Secretaries
1901: E. J. Rudd
1937: G. L. Richards
1952: J. E. Banham
1959: W. C. Clifton

References

Defunct trade unions of the United Kingdom
Furniture industry trade unions
Trade unions established in 1901
Trade unions disestablished in 1969
1901 establishments in the United Kingdom
1969 disestablishments in the United Kingdom
Trade unions based in London